Daviesia polyphylla is a species of flowering plant in the family Fabaceae and is endemic to the south-west of Western Australia. It is a bushy, spreading, glabrous shrub with narrowly egg-shaped or elliptic, sharply-pointed phyllodes and yellow and dark red flowers.

Description

Taxonomy and naming
Daviesia polyphylla was first formally described in 1839 by John Lindley in his book A Sketch of the Vegetation of the Swan River Colony from an unpublished description by George Bentham. The specific epithet (polyphylla) means "many-leaved".

Distribution and habitat
This daviesia grows in heath, mainly in near-coastal areas and on the Darling Range from near Green Head to Busselton in the Avon Wheatbelt, Geraldton Sandplains, Jarrah Forest and Swan Coastal Plain biogeographic regions of south-western Western Australia.

Conservation status
Daviesia polyphylla is listed as "not threatened" by the Western Australian Government Department of Biodiversity, Conservation and Attractions.

References

polyphylla
Eudicots of Western Australia
Plants described in 1839
Taxa named by John Lindley